Brachypterodina is a genus of leaf beetles in the subfamily Eumolpinae. It is found in Costa Rica. The generic name is said to be derived from the Greek brachy (meaning "short") and ptero (meaning "wing"), referring to the reduced or absent hind wings of species in the genus. The proper word for "wing" in ancient Greek is however pteron (πτερόν). It is similar in appearance to Apterodina.

Species
 Brachypterodina gonzalezi Flowers, 2004
 Brachypterodina morae Flowers, 2004

References

Eumolpinae
Chrysomelidae genera
Beetles of Central America